is a Pokémon species in Nintendo and Game Freak's Pokémon franchise. Created by Ken Sugimori, Pichu first appeared in the video games Pokémon Gold and Silver and subsequent sequels, later appearing in various merchandise, spinoff titles and animated and printed adaptations of the franchise. There have been multiple voice actors for Pichu. The two Pichu Brothers characters were voiced by Yumi Tōma and Satomi Kōrogi (who voiced Pichu in Super Smash Bros. Melee and Super Smash Bros. Ultimate), while a spiky-eared Pichu from the film Arceus and the Jewel of Life was voiced by Shōko Nakagawa and Kayzie Rogers.

Known as the "Tiny Mouse" species of the Pokémon series, Pichu is the pre-evolved version of Pikachu. Pichu made its debut appearance in Pokémon Gold and Silver and has since made appearances in the series. Ever since its introduction to the series, Pichu was seen as a sidekick like character towards Pikachu, is often seen in the spinoff games alongside it in games like Pokémon Pinball: Ruby & Sapphire. The Pokémon has been featured in Super Smash Bros. Melee and Super Smash Bros. Ultimate where it was a playable character.

Concept and characteristics
In an interview, Junichi Masuda noted that he and Ken Sugimori wanted to create a Pokémon to be the "next" Pikachu, but were initially having a difficult time creating a design that they felt would be as appealing. After long discussion, they decided to create a Pokémon that evolved into Pikachu, and Sugimori developed Pichu as a result. In the same interview, Masuda noted that Pichu was a Pokémon "close to his heart" due to the "well thought out" design process. In another interview, Masuda stated that Pichu is his favorite Pokémon.

Pichu, known as the "Tiny Mouse" species of Pokémon, are the pre-evolved version of Pikachu. Pichu is a small ground-dwelling rodent. Its fur is very short, and it has bright yellow coloration. The tips of its large ears are black, and it has additional black markings on its neck and short tail. They are not skilled at storing electricity, so when amused or startled, they often discharge jolts of electricity strong enough to affect adult humans. This lack of control becomes more stable as they grow older. The electricity that they do manage to keep stored is limited by their small electrical pouches in their cheeks. When the air is dry or on stormy days, they charge much more easily, leaving the sound of crackling static electricity emanating from them. They play with each other by touching tails to set off sparks, which also acts as a test of courage. They run the risk of shorting each other out, and scaring themselves into a crying fit with the flash of sparks that emanates from them.

Appearances

In the video games
Pichu first appeared in Pokémon Gold and Silver, and is one of many pre-evolutions introduced into the series. It was one of the earliest Pokémon revealed for Gold and Silver, including Cleffa and Igglybuff. Pichu has since appeared in every subsequent main Pokémon title. Pichu also appears in other Pokémon titles, including Pokémon Channel, Pokémon XD: Gale of Darkness, Pokémon Pinball: Ruby & Sapphire, Pokémon Trozei!, the Pokémon Mystery Dungeon titles, the Pokémon Ranger titles, and PokéPark Wii: Pikachu's Adventure. At one point, a Nintendo GameCube game called Pichu Bros: Party Panic was in development but never released, featuring Pichu as the main character. Instead, the game was integrated into Pokémon Channel as an important part of the story-line. In Pokémon Stadium 2 Pichu stars in the mini-game "Pichu's Powerplant". Pichu makes a prominent appearance in Pokémon Ranger: Guardian Signs where it is nicknamed "Ukulele Pichu" as the sidekick to the player's character. Pichu is also an unlockable character in Super Smash Bros. Melee and Super Smash Bros. Ultimate. It has a "cloned" moveset to Pikachu's, but unlike Pikachu, Electric attacks that Pichu uses will cause it to take damage. This caused Pichu to be a lower tier character in Super Smash Bros. Melee, usually seen as a self-imposed handicap for more skilled players. However, in Super Smash Bros. Ultimate, Pichu was greatly improved and seen as considerably better by the Smash Bros. competitive scene.

In other media
Pichu's debut appearance in the anime was in The Apple Corp!, where many were stealing apples from an apple orchard. The Pichu Brothers are a pair of Pichu who has appeared in several anime shorts, including Pikachu & Pichu, Camp Pikachu, several episodes of Pokémon Chronicles and the Pokémon Channel special Pichu Bros. in Party Panic. One, called Pichu Big, has a scruff of fur while the other, Pichu Little, does not. Pichu Little is more mischievous than Pichu Big. A "Spiky-Eared Pichu", appeared in Arceus and the Jewel of Life. She helped Pikachu and Piplup find the keys for the jail cell that held Ash, Dawn, Brock, and Damos. "Ukulele Pichu" appeared in the Pokémon Ranger: Tracks of Light anime special. In the Pokémon Journeys: The Series episode Enter Pikachu!, a Pichu was raised by a Kangaskhan family, and evolved into Ash's Pikachu.

In the Pokémon Adventures manga, Gold owns a Pichu that came from an egg produced by Red and Yellow's Pikachu. It hatches when Gold believes that Professor Oak had given him an ability which causes it to hatch. It used a thunder attack and managed to crack the GS ball which helped Celebi. In the Emerald arc, it teamed up with its parents, to use Volt Tackle on the Kyogre created by Guile Hideout's wish. Pichu is featured in a 2021 Katy Perry music video, Electric.

Promotion and reception
A Pikachu and Pichu-themed Game Boy Color was released by Nintendo. A Pikachu-colored Pichu was available for download using Mystery Gift that, when taken to the Ilex Forest in Pokémon HeartGold and SoulSilver, unlocks a Spiky-eared Pichu. An Amiibo of Pichu has been manufactured by Toys 'R Us. A variety of Pichu's merchandise has been also made, such as the phone charger, and build a bear stuffed animal. Junichi Masuda said that Pichu is his favorite Pokémon, and further stated that "I think it's just really cute, and sometimes I don't even evolve it into Pikachu because it's so cute!". Jonathan Holmes of Destructoid claimed that Pichu is the best Pokémon.

GameSpot editor Frank Provo called Pichu "cute". UGO Networks criticized Pichu as having lost its popularity before the release of Super Smash Bros. Melee, with its only redeeming quality being its resemblance to Pikachu. Destructoid's Jonathan Holmes called Pichu "cute." A staff member for IGN felt that Pichu would rival Pikachu and Marill as the "new favorite." IGN's Pokémon Chick wrote that while some people find it cuter than Pikachu, she found it worthless. She also described it as "stomach-turningly adorable or overmarketed". IGN's Kristine Steiner wrote that the Ukulele Pichu found in Pokémon Ranger: Guardian Signs was "damned cute". Official Nintendo Magazines Thomas East felt Ukulele Pichu was the best part of the game. Gamer Tell's Jenni Lada wrote that the Ukulele Pichu was "incredibly adorable". Jeremy Parish of Polygon ranked 73 fighters from Super Smash Bros. Ultimate "from garbage to glorious", listing Pichu as 55th. David Lozada of GameRevolution listed Pichu as the worst Super Smash Bros. character due to its weight and recoil damage. Phillip Martinez of Screen Rant considered Pichu a "knockoff" of Pikachu. Jordarn Kern of Screen Rant listed Pichu as the cutest electric Pokémon. Jason Mecchi of Screen Rant considered Pichu the cutest rodent Pokémon. Gavin Jasper of Den of Geek ranked Pichu as 65th of Super Smash Bros. Ultimate characters, criticizing its appearance compare to Pikachu. Eric Switzer of the website The Gamer wondered if "everyone hate[s] Pichu", given the relative paucity of merchandise, cards, and other collectables.

Notes

References

External links
 Pichu on Official Pokémon website
 Pichu on Bulbapedia

Nintendo protagonists
Super Smash Bros. fighters
Video game characters introduced in 1999
Pokémon species
Video game characters with electric or magnetic abilities
Child characters in video games
Fictional mice and rats
Fictional rodents